The men's triple jump event at the 1976 Summer Olympics in Montreal, Quebec, Canada, had an entry list of 25 competitors, with two qualifying groups (25 jumpers) before the final (12) took place on Friday July 30, 1976. The top twelve and ties, and all those reaching 16.30 metres advanced to the final. The qualification round was held in Thursday July 29, 1976. The maximum number of athletes per nation had been set at 3 since the 1930 Olympic Congress.

The event was won by Viktor Saneyev of the Soviet Union, the first man to win three gold medals in the triple jump. He matched Vilho Tuulos of Finland in 1920 through 1928 as the only men to have three medals of any color in the event (Tuulos had one gold, two bronze). It was the seventh consecutive Games that the Soviet Union had reached the podium, and third consecutive gold medal for the Soviets, in the event. James Butts's silver put the United States on the men's triple jump podium for the first time since 1928. Brazil won a triple jump medal for the third consecutive Games with João Carlos de Oliveira's bronze.

Summary

Three world record holders came to compete; João Carlos de Oliveira was the current record holder at the 1975 Pan American Games; two time defending champion Viktor Saneyev and Pedro Pérez who had taken Saneyev's record and held it for a year until Saneyev took it back.

All but two finalists hit the 16.30 automatic qualifier, de Oliveira the leader in that round. In the final, Pérez took the early lead with a 16.81 in the first round, James Butts was in second at 16.69, while Saneyev and de Oliveira fouled. In the second round, Saneyev landed a 16.71 but was only third as Butts improved to 16.76. The order switched in the third round when Saneyev jumped 17.06 and de Oliveira went 16.85 to take over the top two spots. In the fourth round, Butts leaped into the lead with 17.18. Saneyev jumped the winner  in the fifth round. On his final attempt, de Oliveira improved to 16.90, but couldn't improve enough to change his medal from bronze.

Saneyev became the third man to win the same event three times in a row, after John Flanagan in the hammer throw and Al Oerter in the discus.

Background

This was the 18th appearance of the event, which is one of 12 athletics events to have been held at every Summer Olympics. Half of the finalists from the 1972 Games returned: two-time gold medalist Viktor Saneyev of the Soviet Union, bronze medalist (and 1968 silver medalist) Nelson Prudêncio of Brazil, fourth-place finisher Carol Corbu of Romania, seventh-place finisher Michał Joachimowski of Poland, tenth-place finisher Bernard Lamitié of France, and twelfth-place finisher Toshiaki Inoue of Japan. Saneyev was the favorite to win a third gold, with world record holder João Carlos de Oliveira of Brazil his most significant challenger.

Antigua and Barbuda made its first appearance in the event. The United States competed for the 18th time, having competed at each of the Games so far.

Competition format

The competition used the two-round format introduced in 1936. In the qualifying round, each jumper received three attempts to reach the qualifying distance of 16.30 metres; if fewer than 12 men did so, the top 12 (including all those tied) would advance. In the final round, each athlete had three jumps; the top eight received an additional three jumps, with the best of the six to count.

Records

Prior to the competition, the existing world and Olympic records were as follows.

No new world and Olympic records were set during this competition.

Schedule

All times are Eastern Daylight Time (UTC-4)

Results

Qualifying

Final

References

T
Triple jump at the Olympics
Men's events at the 1976 Summer Olympics